Hermsdorf is a Verwaltungsgemeinschaft ("collective municipality") in the district Saale-Holzland, in Thuringia, Germany. The seat of the Verwaltungsgemeinschaft is in Hermsdorf.

The Verwaltungsgemeinschaft Hermsdorf consists of the following municipalities:
Hermsdorf
Mörsdorf 
Reichenbach 
Schleifreisen 
Sankt Gangloff

References

Verwaltungsgemeinschaften in Thuringia